Tardal (Village ID 567311) is a village in Kolhapur district, Hatkanagale Taluka, India. According to the 2011 census it has a population of 16445 living in 3565 households.

References

Villages in Kolhapur district